On 19 September 2010 in the small town of Lörrach, Germany, near the Swiss border, Sabine Radmacher, a 41-year-old woman, killed her five-year-old son and the boy's father, her ex-partner. She then crossed the street to St. Elisabethen Hospital, where she shot and stabbed one nurse, killing him, and also injuring eighteen others, including a police officer. Soon after, the woman was fatally shot by special police units.

Background
In March 2009, a similar gun rampage had occurred in nearby Winnenden, when teenage gunman Tim Kretschmer killed twelve people at his former school before killing three civilians and then committing suicide in Wendlingen. The incident triggered off a debate in Germany on tougher gun ownership laws. On 16 September 2010 – only three days before the Lörrach rampage – the boy's father had to appear in court on a charge of failure to securely store his gun.

The killing spree

The hospital rampage took place at around 6:00 p.m. local time at the Catholic St. Elizabeth's Hospital in Lörrach, a town close to the Swiss and French borders. Sabine Radmacher first smothered her five-year-old son, then shot and stabbed the boy's father, her ex-partner. She then set fire to the flat, eventually causing an explosion. She then crossed the street to the St. Elisabethen Hospital and entered the Gynaecology Ward, where she stabbed and shot a nurse, killing him instantly. Eighteen people, including a police officer who happened to be at the hospital, were also shot and wounded. When the emergency services arrived fifteen minutes later, police exchanged fire with the shooter and fatally shot her.

It was revealed by the police that the woman, identified as 41-year-old Sabine Radmacher, was believed to have been involved in an incident earlier on the same day in a nearby building. According to reports, she was seen leaving a burning apartment block opposite the hospital, with a gun in her hand, where two people had lost their lives in an explosion. The police announced that a child was among the two who had been killed. Radmacher was also described as a sporting markswoman and had used a .22 calibre Walther GSP during the rampage.

References

External links

St. Elizabeth's website

2010 mass shootings in Europe
2010 murders in Germany
2010s in Baden-Württemberg
Arson in Germany
Attacks on buildings and structures in Germany
Attacks on hospitals
Deaths by firearm in Germany
Filicides in Germany
Mass shootings in Germany
Murder in Baden-Württemberg
September 2010 crimes
September 2010 events in Germany
Spree shootings in Germany